Galesh Khil (also Romanized as Gālesh Khīl) is a village in Khoshabar Rural District, in the Central District of Rezvanshahr County, Gilan Province, Iran. At the 2006 census, its population was 438, in 115 families.

References 

Populated places in Rezvanshahr County